Bats & Mice is an indie rock band formed in 2000 by Sleepytime Trio members Jonathan Fuller, David NeSmith, and Ben Davis. This line-up produced Bats & Mice's first work, a self-titled EP released on Lovitt Records in fall 2000.

With Bats & Mice members all involved in other bands, such as Milemarker and Rah Bras, the band moved along at a slower pace. Jonathan left the group temporarily to focus his other bands, Denali and Engine Down. Replacing him were Daron Hollowell and Ash Bruce from Four Hundred Years.

The band recorded a full-length album entitled Believe It Mammals, which was released on Lovitt in the spring of 2002, followed by touring with acts like Fugazi, Ted Leo and the Pharmacists, 90 Day Men, Denali, Rah Bras, and Gregor Samsa.

After Hollowell and Bruce left the group to pursue a new project Jay Murphy took over on drums, followed by Luke Herbst, who helped the band record Bats & Mice's second EP, A Person Carrying a Handmade Paper Bag is Considered as a Royal Person. Herbst left the band in 2004 for Oakland, CA, to join Totimoshi, and Jonathan Fuller briefly rejoined the group.

In April 2010 the band announced on their MySpace page that Mark Oates had replaced Fuller as drummer for the band. A new EP is set to be released in June, followed by an East Coast tour.

Discography

References

External links 
 Official site
 Bats & Mice at Lovitt Records
 Bats & Mice at Last.fm
 Bats & Mice at MySpace.com

Indie rock musical groups from Virginia